The MK 214A was a  calibre auto-cannon designed by Mauser Werke AG, for use on Messerschmitt Me 262 and Me 410 bomber-destroyers.

Intended for use on the Messerschmitt Me 262A-1a/U4, Mauser designed the MK 214, derived from the 5 cm Pak 38 anti-tank gun. Initial trials with the MK 214 revealed it to be over-complicated, so a refined version was developed as the MK 214A, flight tests of which were carried out from February 1945 by Karl Baur, but the weapon was not deployed operationally.

A similar installation using the BK 5 cannon was also planned.

References 

Autocannon
Aircraft guns